TheSouthern Collegiate Baseball League (SCBL) is a non-profit, wooden bat collegiate summer league affiliated with the National Alliance of College Summer Baseball. Established in 1999, the league has six teams located in the Charlotte metropolitan area of North Carolina and South Carolina. College players from four-year institutions (NCAA and NAIA) as well as junior and community colleges are eligible to play. The SCBL differs from other summer wooden bat leagues in that pitchers may only throw a maximum of 85 pitches per game. At the end of the season, the teams play in a tournament to determine the league champion.

Current teams

Former teams
 Asheville Redbirds
 Athens Pirates (Georgia)
 Ballantyne Smokies
 Carolina Chaos
 Carolina Stingers
 Carolina Warriors
 Kernersville Bulldogs
 Lenoir Oilers
 Monroe Channelcats
Morganton Aggies
 Pineville Pioneers
 Rock Hill Sox (became Carolina Thunder)
 Salisbury Pirates
 Spartanburg Blue Eagles
 Spartanburg Crickets
 Spartanburg Spartans
 Statesville Owls
 Tennessee Tornado

External links
 Official website

College baseball leagues in the United States
Baseball leagues in North Carolina
Baseball leagues in South Carolina
Summer baseball leagues
1999 establishments in the United States
Sports leagues established in 1999